Pedro Pozo (early  18th century – c. 1810) was a Spanish historical painter. He was born at Lucena. He first studied under Luis Cancino, and afterwards went to Rome. He eventually abandoned painting for literature. His son, also Pedro and an artist, died in America.

References

18th-century Spanish painters
18th-century Spanish male artists
Spanish male painters
19th-century Spanish painters
19th-century Spanish male artists
Spanish Baroque painters
1810 deaths
Year of birth unknown